Bamban, officially the Municipality of Bamban, is a 2nd class municipality in the province of Tarlac, Philippines. According to the 2020 census, it has a population of 78,260 people.

The municipality of Bamban is the southernmost gateway of the melting pot province of Tarlac in the Central Plain of Luzon in the Philippines.

Being the southernmost town in the province, it has a common boundary with Mabalacat, Pampanga, and in the west, with Zambales. The boundary is defined by the Parua River, which is a source of irrigation water, food, and sand and gravel for infrastructure projects. The mountainous region situated in the western part comprises almost two-thirds of the total land area, which used to be within the US Military Reservations. Nestled in this part are the BLISS projects and to the north, the MAR settlement project, which when completely developed will be a source of livelihood and food supplies for Central Luzon.

History

Long before settlers came, the place which was to become the town of Bamban, was a vast track of wild land extending eastward; and on the west side, composed of foothills and mountains lush with vegetation and tall trees extending deep into the Zambales ranges. The thick forest and mountains were then inhabited by the Aetas (locally known as Baluga), and the Zambal, both of whom subsisted only on fishing and native or wild animals which abounded in the place. Occasionally, daring traders from Pampanga and the Tagalog province, mostly enterprising Chinese, braved the wilderness to go northward to Capas and Tarlac.

Before the advent of the Spanish era, small settlers came, attracted by the fertile land and the glittering silver of the river that cut through the mountain to spill down the flat land, making it fertile. The settlers started small clearings in the thick growth of bamban plants which covered vast portions of the land bordering the river a small distance from the foothills.(because of these plants, the place was eventually named Bamban).

Settlers upon settlers came to carve clearings in the land, and soon a small community was formed. About 1700, Augustinian Recollects came and established the Mission de Pueblos de Bamban. But the pueblo was then a part of Pampanga. In 1837, a new boundary line was established, thereby permanently making Bamban part of the province of Tarlac.

Official recognition as a town was sanctioned by the gobernadorcillo in the town of Tarlac. Don Martín Sibal was subsequently appointed head and commissioned with the rank of "Capitán". Among the first settlers were the Sibal, Lugtu, Dayrit, Macale, Vergara, Manipon, and de la Cruz clans.

During the revolution of 1896, Bamban was one of the first towns to take up arms against the Spaniards. Northwest of the town situated among the hills are remnants of strongholds built by brave bands of Bambanenses who joined Gen. Servilliano Aquino in the uprising in Tarlac. Up to this time, a portion of the foothills in the area is called "Batiawan" or look-out point. Many a brave son died in this movement for liberation.

When the Americans came in 1900, the small pueblo gradually grew into a teeming town. The Bamban Sugar Central was established and further gave impetus to its growth. Don Pablo Lagman was the first to be appointed presidente and Don Laureano Campo as vice-presidente under the American military government. Other prominent families then took over the helm of government. During the Commonwealth era, the Sibals, the Lumboys, the Santoses, the Punsalangs, to mention a few, enjoyed political power until the outbreak of World War II.

Bamban was like the legendary phoenix, which locals felt must be resurrected from its ashes. The whole población was devastated and burned during the liberation. Undaunted, the people returned from hiding and began rebuilding even while the campaign was raging deep in the mountains. Growth was fast because of proximity of Clark Air Base. But Bamban can not be the same again. The aftermath of the war was felt for a long time. Consequently, prominent families left the town for the city to establish big business and names for themselves.

The 1991 Mount Pinatubo volcanic eruption and the subsequent flow of lava and mud to the lowlands of Bamban forced residents to move out or to stay at the Dapdap Resettlement Area, which is on higher grounds.

Geography

Barangays

Bamban is politically subdivided into 15 barangays.

 Anupul
 Banaba 
 Bangcu 
 Culubasa 
 Dela Cruz 
 La Paz 
 Lourdes 
 Malonzo 
 San Nicolas (poblacion) 
 San Pedro 
 San Rafael 
 San Roque 
 San Vicente 
 Santo Niño 
 Lumang kalsada
 Virgen de los Remedios (Pacalcal)

Climate

Demographics

Economy

Attractions and points of interest

 At the center of the town is the heritage (F-1812) Santo Niño Parish Church of Bamban (Vicariate of San Nicolas de Tolentino; Vicar Forane: Msgr. Francisco Tañedo
 Titular: Santo Niño, Feast, Last Saturday of January
 Parish priest: Father Claro Lacson
 Parochial vicar: Father Melvin Baldos. - San Nicolas, Bamban, Philippines beside the Santo Niño Academy (Bamban, Tarlac) ]. It belongs to the Roman Catholic Diocese of Tarlac.
 Grotto of Our Lady of Lourdes of Bamban at Dolores
 Bamban Caves and the Matayumtayum well was used by General Francisco Macabulos and his troops against the Spaniards and later on by Filipino guerrillas during the Second World War.

Gallery

See also
Dapdap High School
List of bridges in the Philippines

References

External links

Bamban Profile at PhilAtlas.com
[ Philippine Standard Geographic Code]
Philippine Census Information
Local Governance Performance Management System
 Bamban, Tarlac history, folk lore, photos

Municipalities of Tarlac